Kalabukay Festival (Kalabukay - Cuyunon word for red-vented cockatoo) is an annual celebration for the foundation day of municipality of Dumaran, Palawan in the Philippines. It is also the celebration for successful preservation of the endangered bird called  Katala or Kalabukay and also for preservation of natural resources of the island.

History
The Kalabukay festival started since 2005 with the effort of Katala Foundation and the local government of Dumaran. The five-day celebration from 14th to 18 June includes opening parade, booth exhibit, tree planting, coastal clean-up, basketball competition, and the highlight of the celebration: "Search For Miss Kalabukay".

References

Festivals in the Philippines
Culture of Palawan
Tourist attractions in Palawan